Bommasandra Srinivasaiah Suryanarayana Murthy (16 March 1933 – 26 December 1985), known by his screen name Udaykumar, was an Indian actor and producer in Kannada cinema. He, along with Kalyan Kumar and Rajkumar, were called the Kumarathrayaru (meaning the three Kumars) of Kannada cinema He has authored many dramas and books. He has performed a broad range of roles and worked with all of the prominent actors of his day. He portrayed heroic characters early in his career later it became more nuanced villainous characters, often counterpointing Rajkumar’s heroic persona in historicals and mythologicals.

Vikram Udaykumar and Vishwa Vijetha, his sons, were also performers who starred in several Kannada films and serials. Renukabaali, his daughter, has appeared in various Kannada serials.

Early life 
Udaykumar was born into a family of Mulukanadu Brahmins on 5 March 1933 (some sources say, 16 March 1933). His father's name was B. S. Srinivasaiah, and his mother's name was Sharadamma. Udaykumar was the second of four children born to the couple; he has three sisters. The family had their roots in Andhra Pradesh; their ancestors had moved to Karnataka close to 200 years before Udaykumar's birth. Udaykumar finished primary education in the villages of Heelalige and Muthanallur near the Sarjapura village in Bangalore and secondary schooling in Anekal. During that period, he was an enthusiastic participant in cultural school activities and contests. He married Kamalamma after failing his matriculation exams; he was 20 at the time. Udaykumar thereafter started working as a physical education teacher at an Anekal school. He eventually relocated to Bangalore city on the advice of a friend and joined the theatre company of Gubbi Veeranna where he began his career as an actor.

Film career 

In 1954, story and screenwriter Kanagal Prabhakar Shastry began working on the script of Bhagyodaya. During this time, Udaykumar played Buddha on stage in Mandya with Gubbi Veeranna's theatre troupe, when Shastry's assistant during the time, S. K. Bhagavan, offered him the lead role in the film. Udaykumar was cast in the part after a successful screen test with Shastry a few days later. Shastry also gave Udaykumar his screen name after the film's title and the banner it was being produced under – Udaya Productions.

"Kalakesari", "Natasamrat", and "Pavanasutha" Udaykumar were popular South Indian film artists of yesteryear. "Gandugali" Udaykumar has acted in 193 feature films which include 171 in Kannada, 15 in Telugu, 6 in Tamil, and one in Hindi. He has won many regional and national awards for best performance, especially in Kannada films.

Udayakumar possessed a wide range of abilities. He is admired by his fans as a playwright, a lyricist, a novelist, a music composer, a producer and a director, besides being an actor. AUdayakumar possessed a wide range of abilities. When he was a teenager, he headed a team of volunteers to help his fellow citizens. (At his early age, he was the sole artist to participate in India's liberation movement.) He has battled for the objective of "Kannadigas unification" as a strong leader and orator. He aggressively engaged and took the front line with leaders like Ma. Ramamurthy Kannada flag, Aa. Na. Kru A. N. Krishna Rao, Thirumale Shriranga Tatacharya (of the Karnataka Navodaya movement), Ta. Su. Shama Rao, Dr. Ha. Ma. Nayak, Ta. Ra. Su and many more had fought for the well-being of the language Kannada and the people of Karnataka, through his travels, write-ups, and public speeches throughout the state.

He was a very accomplished stage artist who used his stage plays to convey social messages to the general public through "Udaya Kalanikethana," a training school for Theatrical Arts and Film Acting that he created. Despite his busy filming schedules, Kalakesari Udaykumar used to help underprivileged professional theatre organizations by appearing in plays all throughout Karnataka for at least a week every month beginning in 1960.

Kalakesari Udaykumar (1933-1985) 'was' an 'is' an inspiration to promote a variety of social and cultural activities. On the occasion of Kalakesari Udaykumar's 73rd birthday in 2005, the registered charity trust "Pavanasutha Kesari Kalaa Shalaa" was established. The trust was established during a cultural event called "Udaya-73 ONDU SAVINENAPU" (Udaya-73 a treasured remembrance) held in his birthplace of Anekal, Bangalore. Mr. Vikram Udaykumar, the trust's Founder-President, is backed by Smt. Kamalamma Udaykumar, the Chief Trustee, a team of Executive Trustees, and an advisory group composed of specialists from various fields such as Doctors, Chartered Accountants, Journalists, Advocates, and Seniors. The Trust aims to provide social and cultural services and has established a formal educational institution known as "P.S.M. School" in Anekal, as well as "Kalaashaala," a cultural school that is active in offering opportunities to learn classical music and performing arts such as Bharathanatyam. The trust has numerous dreams. Formal education, educating and encouraging the rural talents in the Performing Arts, arranging drama competitions at the state level, felicitation of achievers from different fields, arranging health camps, blood donation camps, etc.

Filmography

Awards 
He won several National Awards and State awards for best performance.

Karnataka State Film Awards
 1967–68 – Best Supporting Actor
 1977–78 – Best Supporting Actor

References

External links 
 http://www.kalakesariudaykumar.com/
 https://www.youtube.com/channel/UCDPMKYRmyCOJkZ63j72aS5A
 
 

Male actors in Kannada cinema
Male actors from Tamil Nadu
1933 births
1985 deaths
20th-century Indian male actors
People from Dharmapuri district
Male actors in Telugu cinema
Indian male film actors
Kannada film producers
Film producers from Tamil Nadu